The Franklin Mountains are part of the Brooks Range in the North Slope Borough of the U.S. state of Alaska.

References

Brooks Range
Mountains of North Slope Borough, Alaska